The Canada Hose Company Building is a historic firehouse in Cumberland, Allegany County, Maryland, United States. It is a two-story gable-front brick structure. Above the doors used for the fire engines is a sign which reads "Cumberland Hose Co. No. 1."  The building is the oldest of a number of old firehouses built in Cumberland during the 19th century; it was completed in 1845.

The Canada Hose Company Building was listed on the National Register of Historic Places in 1979.

History
The Canada Hose Company Building was built after a major fire in Cumberland, which destroyed over 70 buildings in the area. Though Cumberland had a fire company prior, it was only after the fire that they built the building and upgraded the equipment. Before the fire, the company had been meeting in a shed.

References

External links
, including photo from 1979, at Maryland Historical Trust

Buildings and structures in Cumberland, Maryland
Fire stations on the National Register of Historic Places in Maryland
Infrastructure completed in 1845
National Register of Historic Places in Allegany County, Maryland